Galatasaray SK. Men's 1970–1971 season is the 1970–1971 volleyball season for Turkish professional basketball club Galatasaray Yurtiçi Kargo.

The club competes in:
Turkish Men's Volleyball League

Team Roster Season 1970-1971

Results, schedules and standings

Results

Pts=Points, Pld=Matches played, W=Matches won, L=Matches lost, F=Points for, A=Points against

Turkish Volleyball League 1970–71

Regular season

References

Galatasaray S.K. (men's volleyball) seasons
Galatasaray Sports Club 1970–71 season